Off the Grid is the sixth studio album by the Australian hip hop trio Bliss n Eso, following 2013's Circus in the Sky. It was released on 28 April 2017 through Illusive Sounds. It debuted at number one on the ARIA Albums Chart.

Track listing

Charts

Weekly charts

Year-end charts

Certifications

References

2017 albums
Bliss n Eso albums